Mihovil is a Croatian given name. It is a variant of Michael. It may refer to
Mihovil Logar (1902–1998), Serbian composer
Mihovil Pavlek Miškina (1887–1942), Croatian writer and politician
Mihovil Nakić (born 1955), Croatian basketball player
Mihovil Pavlinović (1831–1887), Croatian politician
Mihovil Španja (born 1984), Croatian paralympic swimmer

Croatian masculine given names